Celso Luiz Nunes Amorim (born 3 June 1942) is a Brazilian diplomat who served as Minister of Foreign Affairs from 20 July 1993 to 31 December 1994 under President Itamar Franco and again from 1 January 2003 to 31 December 2010 under President Luiz Inácio Lula da Silva. He was Minister of Defence from 4 August 2011 to 31 December 2014 under President Dilma Rousseff.

Before his appointment by Lula, Amorim served as Brazil's ambassador to the United Kingdom. On 7 October 2009, Amorim was named the "world's best foreign minister" by Foreign Policy magazine blogger David Rothkopf. 

On 5 January 2023, was appointed as Chief Advisor of the Presidency of Brazil by Luiz Inácio Lula da Silva.

Early life and academic career
Amorim was born in Santos, São Paulo, on June 3, 1942. 

He graduated from the Rio Branco Institute, a graduate school of international relations run by the Ministry of External Relations, in 1965, and obtained his post-graduate degree in International Relations from the Diplomatic Academy of Vienna in 1967.

Amorim was a professor of Portuguese language at the Rio Branco Institute, as well as professor of political science and international relations at the University of Brasília. He is a permanent member of the Foreign Affairs Department of the University of São Paulo Institute of Advanced Studies.

Political career
Amorim has a long history of government service, beginning in 1987 when he was appointed Secretary for International Affairs for the Ministry of Science and Technology. He served in that position until 1989, when he was selected to be the Director-General for Cultural Affairs in the Ministry of External Relations. Amorim was shifted again in 1990, moving to a new post as Director-General for Economic Affairs. In 1993, he was promoted to the position of Secretary General of the Brazilian foreign-affairs agency.

While serving in the Ministry of External Relations, Amorim spent large amounts of time working as an ambassador to the United Nations. Most notably, he represented Brazil on the Kosovo–Yugoslavia sanctions committee in 1998, and the Security Council panel on Iraq in 1999. Amorim was named as Brazil's permanent ambassador to the United Nations and the WTO later that year, and served for two years before becoming ambassador to the United Kingdom in 2001.

WTO controversy
On July 19, 2008, Amorim stirred up controversy by comparing the descriptions used by wealthier countries to characterize the agricultural concessions they were offering during the Doha Round of WTO talks to the work of Nazi propagandist Joseph Goebbels.  This brought a swift condemnation from the U.S. State Department.

Later career
Celso serves on the Commission on Global Security, Justice & Governance, chaired by Madeleine Albright and Ibrahim Gambari. In November 2016, he was appointed by United Nations Secretary-General Ban Ki-moon to the High-Level Panel on Access to Medicines, co-chaired by Ruth Dreifuss, former President of Switzerland, and Festus Mogae, former President of Botswana. 

In addition, Celso holds a number of honorary positions, including the following:
 Unitaid, Chair of the Executive Board (since 2017)
 Center for International Relations and Sustainable Development (CIRSD), Member of the Board of Advisors

In 2019, Amorim joined the inaugural meeting of the so-called Puebla Group in Buenos Aires, a conference of left-leaning political leaders.

Personal life
Amorim is married to Ana Maria Amorim and has four children: Vicente, Anita, João, and Pedro.

References

|-

|-

|-

1942 births
Brazilian diplomats
Living people
People from Santos, São Paulo
Foreign ministers of Brazil
Ambassadors of Brazil to the United Kingdom
Permanent Representatives of Brazil to the United Nations
Permanent Representatives of Brazil to the World Trade Organization
Brazilian columnists
Recipients of the Great Cross of the National Order of Scientific Merit (Brazil)
Defence ministers of Brazil